The Daytime Emmy Award for Outstanding Drama Series  is an award presented annually by the National Academy of Television Arts and Sciences (NATAS) and Academy of Television Arts & Sciences (ATAS). It was first awarded at the 24th Primetime Emmy Awards ceremony, held in 1972, when the award was originally called Outstanding Achievement in a Daytime Drama for two years.

The first daytime-themed Emmy Awards were presented in 1974, when this award was renamed Outstanding Drama Series and given in honor of a daytime drama.  The awards ceremony was not televised in 1983 and 1984, having been criticized for lack of integrity. 
The Emmy was named after an "Immy", an affectionate term used to refer to the image orthicon camera tube. The statuette was designed by Louis McManus, who modeled the award after his wife, Dorothy. The Emmy statuette is fifteen inches tall from base to tip. The statuette weighs 5 pounds and is composed of iron, pewter, zinc and gold.

The award was first presented to  The Doctors, which first aired in 1963. General Hospital holds the record for the most awards, winning on fifteen occasions. In 2007, Guiding Light and The Young and the Restless tied, which was the first tie in this category. The Young and the Restless has also received the most nominations, with a total of thirty-three. ABC has been the most successful network, with a total of twenty-one wins. 

As of the 2022 ceremony, General Hospital is the most recent recipient of the award.

Winners and nominees
Listed below are the winners of the award for each year, as well as the other nominees.

1970s

1980s

1990s

2000s

2010s

2020s

Total awards won

Notes

References

External links
 

Daytime Emmy Awards
Awards established in 1972